I dolci inganni (internationally released as Sweet Deceptions) is a 1960 Italian drama film directed by Alberto Lattuada. The film tells one day in the life of a young adolescent girl who is discovering her sexuality.

Plot
Francesca (Catherine Spaak), a 17-year-old girl, who has a vivid dream of making love to Enrico (Christian Marquand), a 37-year-old divorced architect and family friend. She skips school to watch lovers as she contemplates whether she should act on her feelings.

Cast 
Catherine Spaak as Francesca
Christian Marquand as Enrico
Jean Sorel as Renato
Juanita Faust as Maria Grazia
Milly as the Countess
Marilù Tolo as Margherita 
Giacomo Furia as the salumiere

References

External links

1960 films
Films directed by Alberto Lattuada
1960 drama films
1960s coming-of-age drama films
Films set in Rome
Films shot in Rome
Italian coming-of-age drama films
1960s Italian-language films
1960s Italian films